Emma Beckett (born 16 November 1984) is a former Australian netball player in the ANZ Championship who played for the West Coast Fever. Beckett previously played in the Commonwealth Bank Trophy for the Fever, then called the Perth Orioles, from 2003 to 2007.

References

1984 births
Living people
Australian netball players
West Coast Fever players
ANZ Championship players
People from Kojonup, Western Australia
Perth Orioles players
Netball players from Western Australia
West Australian Netball League players